Ralph Lahquan Staten (born December 3, 1974) is a former American football linebacker and defensive back. He played college football at Alabama before being selected in the seventh round of the 1997 NFL Draft by the Baltimore Ravens. He later also played for Edmonton Eskimos and Ottawa Renegades of the Canadian Football League.

In the 1995 Alabama season, Staten had three interceptions including one against Ole Miss returned 61 yards for a touchdown. He was named to the 1996 All-SEC football team after a 12 sack season. Staten wore number 41 for the Crimson Tide, a hallowed number at Alabama also worn by former All-Americans Courtney Upshaw, Roman Harper, and Vaughn Mancha 

On December 4, 2013, Staten was arrested in George County, Mississippi, following a high-speed chase with the police. He was charged with driving under the influence, and was also being considered a "person of interest" in connection to a missing person case in George County, according to authorities.  A different man, Welford Lee "Pork Chop" McCarty, was later convicted of the missing man's murder.

See also 
 List of NFL players with chronic traumatic encephalopathy

References 

1974 births
Living people
American football linebackers
Alabama Crimson Tide football players
Baltimore Ravens players
Edmonton Elks players
Ottawa Renegades players
People from Semmes, Alabama